Admiral Charles George Edward Patey  (27 February 1811 – 25 March 1881) was a British Royal Navy officer.

Born in 1811 at Chivelstone in Devon, England, Patey was the eldest son of Commander Charles Patey. The young Charles followed his father into the navy at the age of 13, passing through every commissioned rank in the service to eventually be made an admiral of the Royal Navy.

In addition to his distinguished naval record, Admiral Patey was also appointed administrator of Lagos, and of the Gambia, as well as serving as Governor of Saint Helena between 1869 and 1873. In recognition of his services Admiral Patey was awarded the Companion of the Order of St Michael and St George in 1874.

Admiral Patey died in 1881 at Newton St Loe, a small village just outside Bath. Six officers acted as pallbearers at the funeral, among them three admirals.

See also

References

1811 births
1881 deaths
Companions of the Order of St Michael and St George
People from South Hams (district)
Royal Navy admirals
Governors of Saint Helena
Governors of the Gambia
British colonial governors and administrators in Africa